The intellectual and political life of Shia Imams is the name of a book by Rasul Jafarian that has been written with the aim of investigating the political and intellectual aspects of the life of the Shiite twelve Imams. The content of this book was first published as a series of articles in Noor-e Elm magazine and then became an independent book. The book has also been translated into Arabic and Urdu. In 2011, the book was published again with many corrections. Excerpt and summary of this book in 400 pages has been selected by the Research deputy of Islamic Maaref University as a textbook in universities of Iran for history of Imamate course.

Introduction
The author, Rasul Jafarian, writes in a part of the introduction of the book:

Structure
In a 40-page introduction, author first deals with the historiography of the Shiites and their books on the Shiite Imams, and then discusses in detail the political and intellectual aspects of each of their lives. In this way, first, he provided information about their birth and personality, and while pointing to the most prominent feature of each of them, then he studied the political and social situation of the time of that Imam.

The table of contents of this book is briefly:

Worthiness
The book Intellectual and political life of Shia Imams has been the subject of several articles, dissertations and reviews.

See also
 Atlas of Shia
 The specialized library on Islam and Iran
 Bibliography of Rasul Jafarian
 History of Islamic Iran
 Political History of Islam
 Reflection on the Ashura movement
 Rijal al-Kashshi

References

External links
 Hayat-i fikri wa siyasi-yi imaman-i Shia (book)
 History of the Tendency of the People of Basra to the Osman Empire
 The intellectual and political life of Shia Imams on Adineh
 Rasul Jafarian - Google Scholar
 Rasul Jafarian articles in English on SID
 Rasul Jafarian English articles on Magiran

Rasul Jafarian's books
Shia bibliography
Books of Islam and politics
Iranian books
Books of Islamic biography